The article describes the state of race relations and racism in the Middle East. Racism is widely condemned throughout the world, with 174 states parties to the International Convention on the Elimination of All Forms of Racial Discrimination by April 8, 2011.  In different countries, the forms that racism takes may be different for historic, cultural, religious, economic or demographic reasons.

Bahrain

Despite making up the majority of the population, Shia Muslims in Bahrain face severe persecution.

The situation of Shia Muslims has been compared to apartheid.

Iran

According to article 19 of the Iranian constitution:  Iran is a signatory to the International Convention on the Elimination of All Forms of Racial Discrimination.

Iraq

During World War II, Rashid Ali al-Kaylani blamed British hostility toward his pro-Nazi stance on the Iraqi Jewish community.  In 1941, Iraqi nationalists murdered 200 Jews in Baghdad in a pogrom.

After the 1948 Arab–Israeli War, Iraqi Jews faced persecution so great that by 1951, approximately 100,000 of them left the country while the Iraqi rulers confiscated their property and financial assets.

During 1987–1988, Iraqi forces carried out a genocide against the Iraqi Kurds that claimed the lives of hundreds of thousands of people.

The UN reports that although Christians comprise less than 5% of Iraq's population, they make up nearly 40% of the refugees fleeing Iraq. More than 50% of Iraqi Christians have already left the country since 2003. Iraq's Christian community numbered 1.4 million in the early 1980s at the start of Iran–Iraq War. But as the 2003 invasion has radicalized Islamic sensibilities, Christians' total numbers slumped to about 500,000 by 2006, of whom 250,000 live in Baghdad.

Furthermore, the Mandaean and Yazidi communities are at the risk of elimination due to ethnic cleansing by Islamic extremists.

A May 25, 2007 article notes that in the previous seven months only 69 people from Iraq had been granted refugee status in the United States.

Israel

On 22 February 2007, the United Nations Committee on the Elimination of Racial Discrimination will consider the report submitted by Israel under Article 9 of the International Convention on the Elimination of all Forms of Racial Discrimination. The report states that "Racial discrimination is prohibited in Israel. The State of Israel condemns all forms of racial discrimination, and its government has maintained a consistent policy prohibiting such discrimination".

Caputi, this report was challenged by several reports submitted to the committee by other bodies most of which are from Muslim strong or Arab majority States.

Adalah (The Legal Center for Arab Minority Rights in Israel), an Arab advocacy group, has alleged that "the State of Israel pursues discriminatory land and housing policies against Arabs citizens of Israel" and that "the needs of Arabs citizens of Israel are systematically disregarded".

Throughout Jewish Israeli Society, and particularly among the youth, anti-Arab sentiment has spiked, manifesting itself in the form of rising hate crimes, public opinion polls, and hateful comments from high-profile Knesset members. The newspaper Haaretz has prominently written "Let's face it: Israel has a racism problem".

Jordan

Racism is sometimes manifested in football where some people in the audience cause factious affairs since Jordanians usually support Al Faisaly football club and Palestinians support Al Wehdat.

Lebanon

Lebanon has been accused of practicing apartheid against Palestinian residents.  According to Human Rights Watch, "In 2001, Parliament passed a law prohibiting Palestinians from owning property, a right they had for decades. Lebanese law also restricts their ability to work in many areas. In 2005, Lebanon eliminated a ban on Palestinians holding most clerical and technical positions, provided they obtain a temporary work permit from the Labor Ministry, but more than 20 high-level professions remain off-limits to Palestinians.  Few Palestinians have benefited from the 2005 reform, though. In 2009, only 261 of more than 145,679 permits issued to non-Lebanese were for Palestinians. Civil society groups say many Palestinians choose not to apply because they cannot afford the fees and see no reason to pay a portion of their salary toward the National Social Security Fund, since Lebanese law bars Palestinians from receiving social security benefits."

In 2010, Palestinians were granted the same rights to work as other foreigners in the country.

Oman

Omani society is largely tribal. Oman has three known types of identities. Two of these identities are "tribalism and Ibadism", the third identity is linked to "maritime trade". The first two identities are widespread in the interior of Oman, these identities are closely tried to tradition, as a result of lengthy periods of isolation. The third identity, which pertains to Muscat and the coastal areas of Oman, is an identity that has become embodied in business and trade. Consequently, the third identity is generally seen to be more open and tolerant towards others. Thus, tension between socio-cultural groups in Omani society exists. More importantly, is the existence of social inequality between these three groups.

According to the CIA, Oman's population primarily consists of Arab, Baluchi, South Asian (Indian, Pakistani, Sri Lankan, Bangladeshi), and African ethnic groups.
 
The descendants of servant tribes and slaves are victims of widespread discrimination. Omanis of slave origin are sometimes referred to as "khaddam" (servant) and some are subservient to previous masters, despite legal emancipation. Oman was the one of the last nations on earth to abolish slavery in 1970.

It is believed that migrant workers in Oman are treated better than in other Arab states of the Persian Gulf. The plight of domestic workers in Oman is a taboo subject. Every 6 days, an Indian migrant in Oman commits suicide. There has been a campaign urging authorities to check the migrant suicide rate.

Palestine

Various Palestinian organizations and individuals have been regularly accused of being antisemitic. Howard Gutman believes that much of Muslim hatred of Jews stems from the ongoing Arab–Israeli conflict and that peace would significantly reduce anti-semitism.

Qatar

Saudi Arabia

Racism in Saudi Arabia against labor workers who are foreigners, mostly from developing countries. Asian maids have been persecuted victims of racism and discrimination in the country, foreign workers have been exploited, under- or unpaid, physically abused, overworked and locked in their places of employment. The international organisation Human Rights Watch (HRW) describes these conditions as "near-slavery" and attributes them to "deeply rooted gender, religious, and racial discrimination". In many cases the workers are unwilling to report their employers for fear of losing their jobs or further abuse.

Discrimination fueled by religious sentiment is quite common in Saudi Arabia. The most prominent is the discrimination against the Shia sect of Islam minority in the Eastern and southern regions of Saudi. The Shia are disenfranchised by not being allowed into the military, and forbidden to hold key positions in government as well, this is in contrast with Hadar who have a long tradition of holding key positions in the government which dates back to the early days of the Saudi conquest of the Kingdom of Hejaz. The Sufi sects of Sunni Islam which are present in Tihamah and Hijaz are also not exempt from harassment from the strict mainstream Wahabbi sect. One need not stress that there is a discrimination against non-Muslims "usually western foreigners" in general, this usually goes unnoticed as their numbers are quite negligible in comparison to other minorities.

Another form of discrimination is tribalism "tribe against tribe", or favoritism of one's own tribe to others. This happens among Saudies of Bedouin tribalist background, this form of discrimination has roots in the vicious tribal wars and conflicts which predated Saudi Arabia.

There were several cases of  antisemitism in Saudi Arabia and is common within religious circles. Saudi Arabian media often attacks Jews in books, news articles, at their Mosques and with what some describe as antisemitic satire. Saudi Arabian government officials and state religious leaders often promote the idea that Jews are conspiring to take over the entire world; as proof of their claims they publish and frequently cite The Protocols of the Elders of Zion as factual.

Turkey

See also
 Anti-Arabism
 Antisemitism in the Middle East
 Islamophobia
 Racism by country
 Racism in the Arab world

References

Further reading

External links